This is a list of people who have served as Lord Lieutenant for West Glamorgan. The office was created on 1 April 1974.

Sir Cennydd George Traherne, KG, TD† 1 April 1974 – 1987?
Lieutenant of West Glamorgan Col. James Vaughan Williams DL,  1 April 1974 – 1987
Lt.-Col. Sir Michael Rowland Godfrey Llewellyn, 2nd Baronet, 11 December 1987 – 8 September 1994
Commodore Sir Robert Cameron Hastie, KCVO, CBE, RD, 10 April 1995 – 24 May 2008
D. Byron Lewis, June 2008 to 14 February 2020
Roberta Louise Fleet , 16 March 2020 to present.

† Also Lord Lieutenant of Mid Glamorgan and South Glamorgan. Each of the three Counties had a separate Lieutenant serving under the joint Lord Lieutenancy. Three separate Lord Lieutenants were appointed on his retirement

References

External links
H.M. Lord Lieutenant of West Glamorgan

Glamorgan West
 
1974 establishments in Wales